A custard cream is a type of sandwich biscuit popular in the United Kingdom and Republic of Ireland filled with a creamy, custard-flavoured centre. Traditionally, the filling was buttercream (which is still used in most home-made recipes) but nowadays cheaper fats have replaced butter in mass-produced biscuits. The filling tastes of vanilla and as such is more akin to the taste of custard made with custard powder than egg custard. It is believed that the custard cream biscuit originated in Britain in 1908. Usually, they have an elaborate baroque design stamped onto them, originating in the Victorian era and representing ferns.

Some British and Irish supermarkets produce their own brand versions, with variations including lemon, orange, chocolate, strawberry, coffee, tangerine, rhubarb & custard and coconut flavours. There is a digestive cream version available, in which the biscuit is replaced with a digestive biscuit. In a 2007 poll of 7,000 Britons, 9 out of 10 voted custard creams to be their favourite biscuit. In 2009 it was ranked the eighth most popular biscuit in the UK to dunk into tea. In the same year, a study by Mindlab International listed custard creams as the most likely biscuit to cause injury or harm, scoring a so-called "risk rating" of 5.64.

References

Biscuits